Julio Rodríguez Martínez (25 April 1928 – 28 January 1979) was a Spanish politician who served as Minister of Education and Science of Spain in 1973, during the Francoist dictatorship.

References

1928 births
1979 deaths
Education ministers of Spain
Government ministers during the Francoist dictatorship